The 1976 French Open was a tennis tournament that took place on the outdoor clay courts at the Stade Roland Garros in Paris, France. The tournament ran from 31 May until 14 June. It was the 80th staging of the French Open, and the second Grand Slam tennis event of 1976.

Final

Men's singles 

 Adriano Panatta defeated  Harold Solomon, 6–1, 6–4, 4–6, 7–6(7–3) 
It was Panatta's 1st (and only) career Grand Slam title.

Women's singles 

 Sue Barker defeated  Renáta Tomanová, 6–2, 0–6, 6–2  
It was Barker's 1st (and only) career Grand Slam title.

Men's doubles 

 Frederick McNair /  Sherwood Stewart defeated  Brian Gottfried /  Raúl Ramírez, 7–6(8-6), 6–3, 6–1

Women's doubles 

 Fiorella Bonicelli /  Gail Sherriff Chanfreau Lovera defeated  Kathleen Harter /  Helga Niessen Masthoff, 6–4, 1–6, 6–3

Mixed doubles 

 Ilana Kloss /  Kim Warwick defeated  Delina Boshoff /  Colin Dowdeswell, 5–7, 7–6, 6–2

Prize money

References

External links
 French Open official website

 
1976 Grand Prix (tennis)
1976 in French tennis
1976 in Paris